Several ships of the Argentine Navy have been named ARA Hércules (or Hércules before the 1860s):

 , a frigate that served as flagship of the second Argentine squadron during the Independence War
 , a steamship that served in the war between Buenos Aires and the Argentine Confederation
 , a frigate in Argentine service 1946–1973, ex USS Asheville (PF-1) and ex- HMS Adus
 , a multipurpose transport in service as of 2015, previously a Type 42 destroyer (D-1) with the same name.

Argentine Navy ship names